Nouakchott–Oumtounsy International Airport  is an international airport serving Nouakchott, the capital of Mauritania. The airport opened in June 2016 as the replacement for Nouakchott International Airport.

History

The airport is designed by Omer Houessou, it is the largest project in Mauritania since 1960. The Government of Mauritania approved the plan on 13 October 2011, and local company Najah for Major Works (NMW) started construction the following month.

Oumtounsy Airport opened on 23 June 2016, in time for the 27th Arab League summit in late July. A Mauritania Airlines International flight from Zouérat arrived at 12:00, becoming the first to land at the airport. President Mohamed Ould Abdel Aziz arrived in the afternoon to inaugurate the airport amid the landing of the first international flight, that of Turkish Airlines from Istanbul–Atatürk.

Infrastructure
The  passenger terminal has 6 jet bridges and can handle 2 million passengers per year. There is also a dedicated terminal for air cargo and a VIP reception area.

Runways
The airport has two runways:
 Runway 06/24: 
 Runway 16/34:

Airlines and destinations
The following airlines operate regular scheduled and charter flights at Nouakchott–Oumtounsy Airport:

Access
Nouakchott–Oumtounsy International Airport is connected to the city of Nouakchott by Sheikh Zayed Road.

See also
 List of airports in Mauritania

References

Airports in Mauritania
Nouakchott
Airports established in 2016
2016 establishments in Mauritania